Moody (also released as Moody's Workshop) is an album by saxophonist James Moody composed of sessions from 1954 with a septet arranged by Quincy Jones. The LP was released on the Prestige label.

Reception

Scott Yanow, writing for AllMusic, stated: "In the mid-'50s James Moody led a four-horn septet that played music falling somewhere between bop and rhythm & blues. The danceable rhythms and riffing made its recordings somewhat accessible but the solos of Moody (on tenor and alto) and trumpeter Dave Burns also held listener's interests".

Track listing
All compositions by Quincy Jones, except where indicated.
 "Keepin' Up with Jonesy" – 3:14
 "Workshop" (Gil Fuller) – 3:08
 "NJR (I'm Gone)" – 3:19
 "A Hundred Years from Today" (Ned Washington, Joe Young, Victor Young) – 2:45
 "Jack Raggs" (Jack Raggs) – 2:40
 "Mambo with Moody" (James Moody, Newbolt) – 4:07
 "Over the Rainbow" (Harold Arlen, Yip Harburg) – 3:03
 "Blues in the Closet" (Oscar Pettiford) – 3:53
 "Moody's Mood for Blues" – 5:35
 "Nobody Knows the Trouble I've Seen" (Traditional) – 2:51
 "It Might as Well Be Spring" - (tenor sax take) (Oscar Hammerstein II, Richard Rodgers) – 3:51
Recorded at Van Gelder Studio in Hackensack, New Jersey on January 8, 1954 (tracks 1-4), April 12, 1954 (tracks 5-7), September 29, 1954 (tracks 8, 9 & 11) and January 28, 1955 (track 10)

Personnel
James Moody – tenor saxophone, alto saxophone
Dave Burns – trumpet
William Shepherd – trombone
Pee Wee Moore – baritone saxophone
Sadik Hakim (tracks 1-4), Jimmy Boyd (tracks 5-11) – piano
John Latham – bass
Joe Harris (tracks 1-7), Clarence Johnston (tracks 8-11) – drums
Quincy Jones – arranger
Eddie Jefferson – vocal (track 2)
Rudy Van Gelder – engineer

References

James Moody (saxophonist) albums
1956 albums
Prestige Records albums
Albums recorded at Van Gelder Studio
Albums arranged by Quincy Jones